Peter de Ru is a photographer born 1946 in Oostkapelle in The Netherlands. In 1969 he moved to Sweden. After language studies at the Göteborg University he moved to Stockholm and entered the renowned Fotoskolan (Photo School) under Christer Strömholm where he studied 1971 to 1974.  He is married to the Swedish artist Susann Wallander. Peter de Ru is represented at several state institutions like the Swedish Radio, the Nobel Museum, the Karolinska Hospital, and since 2011 at the National Museum in Stockholm (the Swedish State portrait gallery at Gripsholm).

Books 
 Vi Ses Atlantic Alicia, 1980, 
 Karolinska Sjukhuset, 2003, 
 Sven, 2008,

External links 
 http://www.miljomagasinet.se/artiklar/120411-peter-de-ru-malar-med-kameran.html
 http://gruppof.blogspot.se/2007/02/invited-guest-peter-de-ru.html
 https://web.archive.org/web/20130323004429/http://www.sfoto.se/f/nyheter/peter-de-ru-minns-ett-engagerat-80-tal
 http://www.peterderu.se
 https://web.archive.org/web/20140110152338/https://www.lensculture.com/peter-de-ru

1946 births
Living people
Dutch photographers
Swedish photographers
People from Veere